Steve Hofmeyr (born 29 August 1964) is a South African singer, songwriter, writer, actor and former TV presenter.

Personal life
Hofmeyr married actress Natasha Sutherland, whom he had met on the set of Egoli: Place of Gold in 1998. They had two sons. Hofmeyr also has two sons and two daughters with other women. The couple was divorced after reports of numerous affairs dominated Hofmeyr's time in the spotlight in 2008.

In December 2008, Hofmeyr allegedly assaulted Esmaré Weideman, editor of Huisgenoot, a popular Afrikaans magazine, by pouring a cup of cold tea over her at the Miss South Africa finals. He was said to have blamed her and two other journalists for his divorce from Sutherland. Weideman subsequently dropped her accusations of assault.

On 19 December 2013, Hofmeyr was arrested in Bronkhorstspruit for driving at 169 km/h in an 80 km/h zone and was released on bail of R500. He was subsequently fined R10,000 in the Bronkhorstspruit Magistrate's Court on 23 January 2014.

Hofmeyr married Janine van der Vyver on 26 January 2014. In 2008, van der Vyver, a fitness instructor, revealed they had been seeing each other for 10 years. Their daughter, Romy Lee, was born 19 June 2017.

Hofmeyr's grandfather, Steve Hofmeyr Sr., was a leader in the Ossewabrandwag.

Hofmyer is also an outspoken Christian. He served the compulsory two years of military service required in South Africa at the time.

Controversies

News Cafe Controversy 

In January 2007, there were reports that one branch of the News Cafe restaurant chain would not play Hofmeyr's song "Pampoen". The managing director of the company that owns the franchise denies that this is company policy and points out that many Afrikaans acts, such as Karen Zoid and Arno Carstens have performed at News Cafe.

Racism 

On 12 May 2011, Hofmeyr released the lyrics to his new song called "Ons sal dit oorleef", which means "We will survive this". The song is controversial, because Hofmeyr threatened to include the ethnic slur "kaffir" in the lyrics of the song. 
Hofmeyr removed the offensive word in his song, citing that the word would offend his black friends and colleagues.

In 2011, he made public that he supports the Afrikaner advocacy group "Expedition for Afrikaner Self-Determination"  (Onafhanklike Afrikaner Selfbeskikkingsekspedisie, OASE).

Hofmeyr was heavily criticised after performing the former South African national anthem, Die Stem, at a cultural festival known as Innibos in Nelspruit in July 2014. He went on to perform the anthem on international tours, and encouraged white South Africans to continue singing it, stating that it did not contain any form of hate speech.

In October 2014, Hofmeyr wrote and published a tweet stating that he believed that black South Africans were the "architects of apartheid" on his public Twitter account. This prompted a significant public backlash. One of Hofmeyr's critics was puppeteer Conrad Koch through his puppet Chester Missing, who launched a campaign calling on companies to stop sponsoring Hofmeyr. On 27 November 2014, Hofmeyr failed to acquire a final protection order against Koch and his puppet in the Randburg Magistrate's Court.

Hofmeyr has given statements indicative of apartheid denialism, leading various journalists and political analysts to label him a "disgrace to South Africa".

Views on LGBTQ+ 

Hofmeyr criticized Disney's plan to have more inclusive characters, suggesting this was a way of teaching children "bestiality" and that the "+” in LGBTQ+ could be inclusive of relationships with animals. The South African Human Rights Commission has set out demands for Hofmeyr to pay an amount of R500,000 to an NPO who fights for the rights of the LGBTQ+ community, post a formal apology to the LGBTQ+ community, serve 20 hours of community service at an LGBTQ+ center, and attend a workshop on diversity and inclusivity.

Claims about murders of white South Africans

Hofmeyr has made numerous claims relating to murders of white South Africans. Hofmeyr has claimed that whites, and in particular Afrikaners, are being "killed like flies", posting on Facebook that "my tribe is dying". Hofmeyr also posted a picture of a "World Cup soccer stadium" which he claimed could be filled by the number of whites murdered by blacks. Africa Check, a fact-checking organisation has found Hofmeyr's claims to be "incorrect and grossly exaggerated", pointing out that whites are in fact "less likely to be murdered than any other race group". Lizette Lancaster from the Institute for Security Studies told Africa Check that "Whites are far less likely to be murdered than their black or coloured counterparts." While white South Africans account for nearly 9% of the population, they account for  8.1% of murder victims.

Removal from MultiChoice networks

On 30 April 2019, all content with Hofmeyr was removed from all MultiChoice networks, most notably DStv after Steve's nationalist song "Die Land" (The Land) was removed from an award show category from Multichoice request. In response, Hofmeyr called for a boycott of Multichoice, calling for fans to destroy their DStv boxes.

Due to this, Afrikaans singers, including Bobby van Jaarsveld and Bok van Blerk boycotted a number of televised award shows and concerts in solidarity.

Discography

Desertbound (1989)
Only Me (1990)
Steve (1991)
No Hero (1992)
Tribute (1993)
Tribute Volume 2 (1994)
The Hits/Die Treffers (1994)
Decade (1995)
Close to You (1997)
True to You (1997)
Die Bloubul (1997)
Southern Cross (1999)
Die Bok Kom Weer (1999)
Beautiful Noise (2000)
Grootste Treffers Volume 2 (2000)
Engele Om Ons (2001)
Toeka (2003)
Toeka 2 (2004)
Grootste Platinum Treffers (2005)
Laaities & Ladies (2006)
Waarmaker (2007)
Go Bulle Go (2008)
Sings Kris Kristofferson (2008)
Solitary Man – Songs of Neil Diamond (2009)
Duisend en Een (2010)
Haloda (2011) (SA No. 16) 
25 Jaar se Bestes (2012)
 Toeka 3 (2014) (SA No. 1)
If you could read my mind (2015) (SA No. 2)
Skree (2017) (SA No. 1)
 The Country Collection (2018) (SA No. 1)
The Country Collection Vol. 3 (2019)
Ek Kort... (2020)

Filmography

Stage
Summer Holiday
Joseph and the Amazing Technicolor Dreamcoat
Die Soen
'n Plek Binne Jou Seun
Sound of Music
Dis Hoe Dit Was – Die Steve Hofmeyr Storie
Lied van my Hart
Boeta se Vel Fluit

Film
Kampus (1986)
Agter Elke Man (1990)
No Hero (1992)
Die Gevaar Van De AAR (1993)
A Case of Murder (2004)
Bakgat 2 (2010)
Platteland (2011)
Pretville (2012)
Treurgrond (2015)

Television
Guillam Woudberg (1985)
Agter Elke Man (1986–1988)
Egoli (1992–2001)
Sporting Chance (1995)
7de Laan (2007–2012)
Comedy Central Roast of Steve Hofmeyr (2012)
Dis Hoe Dit Is met Steve (2006 -)

Die Kwesbares (2020)

References

20th-century South African male singers
21st-century South African male singers
Afrikaans-language singers
Living people
People from Pretoria
Afrikaner people
Alumni of Grey College, Bloemfontein
Afrikaner nationalists
South African white nationalists
1964 births